The Tullamore transmitter was an AM radio transmission mast located near Tullamore, Ireland. Built in 1975 to replace the Athlone transmitter, it always carried RTÉ Radio 1 on 567 kHz, at 500 kW. The old Athlone mast was used to carry RTÉ 2fm, and later decommissioned.

The entire setup was taken off-line for a time in 2004 for major maintenance, with the Clarkstown transmitter taking over Tullamore's AM broadcast. Tullamore ceased analogue broadcasts permanently on 24 March 2008 , as the Clarkstown longwave transmitter provides improved coverage of the UK at the same transmission power.

The antenna, a 290-metre (952') tall guyed mast, is the second tallest structure in Ireland.

See also
 List of famous transmission sites

References

External links
 http://www.skyscraperpage.com/cities/?buildingID=54195

Buildings and structures in Tullamore
Towers in the Republic of Ireland
Towers completed in 1975
1975 establishments in Ireland